Mühlhausen (Thür) station is a passenger station in the Unstrut-Hainich district and the only station in Mühlhausen in the German state of Thuringia. It is located east of the centre of Mühlhausen in the valley of the Unstrut.

History 
Mühlhausen was connected to a railway the first time in 1870 with the opening of the Gotha–Leinefelde line of the Thuringian Railway Company. A junction station was added to the existing through station in 1897 for the opening of the light railway to Ebeleben by the Mühlhausen-Ebeleben Railway Company (Eisenbahn-Gesellschaft Mühlhausen-Ebeleben, MEE).  The Mühlhausen Tramway opened its first line from the station forecourt in 1898. The station was rebuilt with the opening of the line to Treffurt in 1911 and the MEE station was integrated with the former Thuringian Railway Company station, by then part of the Prussian state railways.

In 1969 the tramway was shut down and in the same year freight transport also ended on the last remaining remnant of the line to Treffurt, which was partly closed after the Second World War due to the establishment of the Inner German border Treffurt. Freight services to Ebeleben were closed in 1994 and passenger services ended on 31 May 1997 so that Mühlhausen’s period as a junction station came to an end after 100 years.

Since  2000, the station has had no major freight traffic and many of the former freight tracks have been removed.

Operations 
In the 2016 timetable Mühlhausen (Thür) station was served by the following lines:

 RE 1: Göttingen – Leinefelde – Mühlhausen – Gotha – Erfurt – Gera – Glauchau (Sachs) (every 120 minutes) 
 RE 2: Kassel-Wilhelmshöhe – Leinefelde – Mühlhausen – Erfurt (every 120 minutes)
 RB 52: Leinefelde – Mühlhausen – Bad Langensalza – Erfurt (every 120 minutes)

External links 

Railway stations in Thuringia
Mühlhausen
Buildings and structures in Unstrut-Hainich-Kreis
Railway stations in Germany opened in 1870